Princess Gyeonghwa (Hangul: 경화궁주 or 경화공주, Hanja: 敬和宮主 or 敬和公主) was a Goryeo Royal Princess as the third and youngest daughter of King Gongyang and Royal Consort Sun. Following the establishment of the new Joseon dynasty, Princess Gyeonghwa became the last Goryeo Royal Princess (born from Queen)

Biography

Early life and marriage
From child, the Princess was raised by one of King Gongmin's widowed consort, Lady Han in her own house and because of this, Lady Han was given lands by the Princess's father, King Gongyang of Goryeo. Then, in 1390, she honoured as Princess Gyeonghwa (경화궁주, 敬和宮主) along with her sisters, and married Gang Hoe-gye, Prince Jinwon (강회계 진원군) on August in the same year.

Husband's family
Gang Hoe-gye was the son of Gang-Si (강시) from the Jinju Gang clan (진주 강씨, 晉州 姜氏), also the younger brother of Gang Hoe-baek (강회백). Gang become Prince Jinwon (진원군) in August after his marriage with the Princess. However, in July 1392, after Yi Seong-Gye's ascension to the throne and made the new dynasty, Gang was sentenced to death and was beheaded along with U Seong-beom (우성범), the Princess's second older-brother-in-law.

Meanwhile, her father In-law, Gang-Si (강시) was ordered to executed on 29 May 1397, then died on 13 November 1400 (2nd year reign of Jeongjong of Joseon) at the age 62 years old and given a posthumous name Gongmok (공목, 恭穆). Meanwhile, all of her family (father, mother, sisters and brother) were exiled to Samcheok in 1394, but it was not said whether the Princess also got exiled or not. After the fallen of Goryeo Dynasty, the Princess's existence was unknown since there were no records left about this.

References

Year of birth unknown
Year of death unknown
Goryeo princesses